Chassin is a town in the Babonneau region of the Caribbean island of Saint Lucia.

The town first received a piped water supply in 2000. An aerial tramway in the rainforest was built in 2006.

References

Towns in Saint Lucia